The 1996 Cornell Big Red football team was an American football team that represented Cornell University during the 1996 NCAA Division I-AA football season. Cornell tied for third in the Ivy League. 

In its seventh season under head coach Jim Hofher, the team compiled a 4–6 record and was outscored 280 to 221. Steve Busch, Chad Levitt, Seth Payne and Brian Weidel were team captains. 

Cornell's 4–3 conference record tied for third place in the Ivy League standings. The Big Red were outscored 178 to 157 by Ivy opponents.

Cornell played its home games at Schoellkopf Field in Ithaca, New York.

Schedule

References

Cornell
Cornell Big Red football seasons
Cornell Big Red football